The 1899 Cleveland Spiders season was the team's 13th and final season in Major League Baseball (MLB), and their 11th season in the National League (NL).

The Spiders' team owners, the Robison family, also owned the St. Louis Perfectos. To strengthen the Perfectos, they transferred the Spiders' best players to St. Louis before the season, leaving Cleveland with a substantially depleted roster. As the Spiders played poorly and continued to lose that season, people stopped attending their home games, and other teams refused to travel to Cleveland to play road games against the Spiders. This resulted in the Spiders being forced to play most of their games on the road.

The Spiders finished in 12th place, last in the NL, with a record of 20–134. This remains the worst single-season record for an MLB team in terms of winning percentage (.130). The team allowed 1252 runs while only scoring 529, a run differential of −723 for the season, the worst in MLB history.

Offseason 

In early 1899, the owners of the Spiders, the Robison brothers, Frank and Stanley, bought the St. Louis Browns baseball club from Chris von der Ahe, renaming it the Perfectos. However, they continued to retain ownership of the Cleveland club, an obvious conflict of interest that was later prohibited by Major League Baseball.

The Robisons decided that a good team in St. Louis would draw more fans, so they transferred most of the Cleveland stars, including future Hall of Famers Cy Young, Jesse Burkett and Bobby Wallace, as well as manager Patsy Tebeau, to St. Louis.  Most of the players Cleveland received were non-entities.  Jack Clements (known to history as one of MLB's few left-handed throwing catchers) and Joe Quinn were at the end of successful careers, and player-manager Lave Cross was traded back to St. Louis after the Spiders got off to an 8–30 start.

According to various individual pages at Baseball-Reference.com, most of this activity took place on March 29, 1899, just 17 days before the beginning of the new season:

Pitchers
Frank Bates, George Cuppy, Cowboy Jones, Pete McBride, Jack Powell, Zeke Wilson, Cy Young to St. Louis
Kid Carsey, Jim Hughey, Harry Maupin, Willie Sudhoff to Cleveland

Catchers
Lou Criger, Jack O'Connor to St. Louis
Jack Clements, Joe Sugden to Cleveland

Infielders
Jimmy Burke, Cupid Childs, Ed McKean, Ossee Schreckengost, Bobby Wallace to St. Louis
Patsy Tebeau to St. Louis (to be manager)
Joe Quinn, Suter Sullivan, Tommy Tucker to Cleveland
Lave Cross to Cleveland (to be player-manager)

Outfielders
Harry Blake, Jesse Burkett, Emmet Heidrick to St. Louis
Tommy Dowd, Dick Harley to Cleveland

They also transferred numerous home games to the road—including the original Opening Day game to St. Louis.  As a result, the Spiders did not play their first home game until May 1.

In early April, the Spiders started training in Terre Haute, Indiana. Because of the cold weather, the team had to practice inside a gymnasium.

Regular season 
With a decimated roster, it was apparent almost from the start that the Spiders would make a wretched showing. After their first game, in which they were beaten by the Perfectos, 10–1, the headline of the April 16 edition of The Plain Dealer proved to be prescient: "THE FARCE HAS BEGUN."

After a poor start on the road, the Spiders played a home-opening doubleheader on May 1 in front of 100 fans. They split the two games, moving up to 11th place. However, they were back in last before long.

On June 2, the Spiders led the Brooklyn Superbas, 10–0, in the sixth inning, but they blew the lead and ended up losing, 11–10. On June 11, the Spiders lost to the Cincinnati Reds, 10–1, behind Frank Bates' poor pitching. It was the Spiders' 11th straight loss on that road trip. The following day, the Spiders returned home and lost to the Pittsburgh Pirates in front of 58 fans. The team kept losing games, and losses came more and more frequently as the season went on.

On August 16, with Bates pitching, the Spiders lost to the Superbas, 13–2. This led to criticism from the Cleveland Plain Dealer. On August 18, the first-place Superbas completed their sweep of the Spiders, outscoring them, 43–8, in four games.

The Spiders notched their 100th loss of the season on August 31, falling to the Superbas, 9–3. Two days later, the Spiders played a local amateur team in Johnstown, Pennsylvania, and lost, 7–5. On September 12, the Spiders lost both games of a doubleheader to the Philadelphia Phillies. At that point, they were 19–114 and had broken the MLB single-season record for losses, which had been 113.

On October 15, the Spiders ended their season by losing both games of a doubleheader to the Cincinnati Reds, by scores of 16–1 and 19–3. The Spiders finished in 12th place, last in the NL. After losing 40 of their last 41 games, they had a record of 20–134 (.130). Their record is still the worst in Major League Baseball history. They trailed the pennant-winning Brooklyn Superbas by 84 games, and finished 35 games behind the 11th place Washington Senators. For comparison, this would project to 21–141 under the current schedule, and Pythagorean expectation based on the Spiders' results and the current 162-game schedule would translate to a record of 25–137.

The 1899 Spiders were 9–33 (.214) at home and 11–101 (.098) on the road. The team's longest winning streak of the season was two games, which they accomplished once: on May 20 against the Phillies and May 21 against the Colonels. They also accumulated the second-longest losing streak in league history, at 24 games from August 26 to September 16, trailing only the 26-game losing streak set by the 1889 Louisville Colonels. The Spiders were winless against two teams: Brooklyn and Cincinnati.

Spiders opponents scored ten or more runs 49 times in 154 games.  Pitchers Jim Hughey (4–30) and Charlie Knepper (4–22) tied for the team lead in wins. The pitching staff allowed a record 1,252 runs in 154 games. The Spiders batters combined to hit 12 home runs, matching former Spiders star Bobby Wallace, who hit 12 home runs for St. Louis.

The 1899 Spiders did lead the league in one statistic—games played. Cleveland was the only team in the league to finish all of its games in the then-154 game schedule of the 1899 season, a rather unusual occurrence in that era.

In terms of absolute numbers, the record for futility of 20 wins in any official MLB season stood until the COVID-19 pandemic shortened the 2020 season to only 60 games; even then, 29 of the then-30 teams managed to win more than 20 games with the Pittsburgh Pirates, who finished 19–41, winning one less game than the 1899 Spiders.

Attendance

In early 1899, team owner Stanley Robison publicly announced his intention to run the Spiders "as a sideshow", and fans took him at his word: after the first 16 home games, Cleveland's total attendance was 3,179, for a trifling average of 199 people per game. Other NL teams responded by refusing to travel to Cleveland's League Park, since their cut of the ticket revenue would not come close to covering their travel and hotel expenses. 

As a result, the Spiders only played 26 more home games for the rest of the season, including only eight after July 1. Their record of 101 road losses will never be threatened, as it is unbreakable under MLB's current scheduling practices where a team plays a maximum of 81 road games. Sportswriters of the day began referring to the team as the "Exiles" and "Wanderers."

A mere 6,088 fans paid for Spiders home games in 1899, or an incredibly low average of 145 people per game. By comparison, St. Louis drew 373,909 fans for their home season, including 15,000 for one game (their home opener against the Spiders).

Aftermath
The dismal 1899 season was the end for the Spiders, and for National League baseball in Cleveland. The Spiders were disbanded, along with the original Baltimore Orioles, the Louisville Colonels (Louisville has not had a major league team since), and the original Washington Senators, as the National League contracted from 12 teams to 8.  

The departure of baseball from Cleveland left an opening for the upstart American League, which opened for business in 1901 as a second major league and included among its charter members a new team, the Cleveland Blues. The Blues still exist today as the Cleveland Guardians. Currently, the 1962 New York Mets (120 losses) and 2003 Detroit Tigers (119) have the post-1900 NL and AL records for most losses in a season, respectively. After the Spiders folded, a National League team would not play in Cleveland again until the Guardians (then known as the Indians) played the Brooklyn Robins in the 1920 World Series, which they won in 7 games. Meanwhile, in St. Louis, the Perfectos were renamed the St. Louis Cardinals in 1900, which they are still called today.

Season standings

Record vs. opponents

Notable transactions 
June 5, 1899: Some of the  March 29 activity was undone. Willie Sudhoff and Lave Cross were sent by the Spiders back to the Perfectos, with Frank Bates and Ossee Schreckengost coming back to Cleveland.

Roster

Player stats

Batting

Starters by position 
Note: Pos = Position; G = Games played; AB = At bats; H = Hits; Avg. = Batting average; HR = Home runs; RBI = Runs batted in

Other batters 
Note: G = Games played; AB = At bats; H = Hits; Avg. = Batting average; HR = Home runs; RBI = Runs batted in

Pitching

Starting pitchers 
Note: G = Games pitched; IP = Innings pitched; W = Wins; L = Losses; ERA = Earned run average; SO = Strikeouts

Other pitchers 
Note: G = Games pitched; IP = Innings pitched; W = Wins; L = Losses; ERA = Earned run average; SO = Strikeouts

See also
List of worst Major League Baseball season records
List of Major League Baseball records considered unbreakable
Cleveland sports curse

Sources
Hetrick, J. Thomas (1999). Misfits! Baseball's Worst Ever Team. Pocol Press.

References

External links
1899 Cleveland Spiders at Baseball Reference
Cleveland roster 1898
St. Louis roster 1898
Cleveland roster 1899
St. Louis roster 1899

Cleveland Spiders seasons
Cleveland Spiders season
Cleveland Spiders